The Dilworth Elementary School in Pittsburgh, Pennsylvania, is a historic school building, completed in April 1915.   it is a traditional Magnet school for pre-kindergarten through the fifth grade in the Pittsburgh Public Schools system. It was listed on the National Register of Historic Places in 1986.

History
The school is named for the Dilworth family.  William Dilworth (1791-1871) is credited with providing a school and teacher on Mt. Washington in the 1820s.  Mary Parry Dilworth, widow of descendant John S. Dilworth later donated the land on which the Dilworth school was built.  The architects, Martin U. Vrydaugh and Thomas B. Wolfe, also designed churches and homes for wealthy patrons, including the Calvary United Methodist Church.  The school was designed three years after the Pittsburgh and Allegheny City school boards where merged.

The building is brick, H shaped, two and one half stories high.  It was a consciously elegant design, stylistically unique in the city when built, echoing European school designs.  It included kindergarten and basement play spaces as were becoming essential at the time; but here the playrooms did not receive as much design attention as such elements would later on, and were not particularly functional.   An auditorium was added in 1927 and was well designed for its intended use with a full stage, and directly accessible without entering the main portion of the school.

References

School buildings on the National Register of Historic Places in Pennsylvania
Schools in Pittsburgh
Tudor Revival architecture in Pennsylvania
School buildings completed in 1914
Pittsburgh History & Landmarks Foundation Historic Landmarks
City of Pittsburgh historic designations
National Register of Historic Places in Pittsburgh
1914 establishments in Pennsylvania